Jean Dumesnil  (1944 – 22 November 2022) was a Canadian academic and cardiologist. He was distinguished by his work on coronary dilations and echocardiography.

Bibliography
Bon poids, bon cœur avec la méthode Montignac (2002)
Bon poids, bon cœur au quotidien : de l'épicerie à la table : conseils et recettes (2004)

Honors
Annual Achievement Award of the Canadian Society of Echocardiography (1999)
Knight of the National Order of Quebec (2004)
Honorary fellow of the American Society of Echocardiology (2010)
Professor emeritus of the Université Laval (2011)

References

1944 births
2022 deaths
French Quebecers
Canadian cardiologists
Academic staff of Université Laval
Knights of the National Order of Quebec